Linwood Wray Carlton (born June 18, 1937) is a former American gridiron football running back who played professionally in both Canada and the United States.

Unable to come to terms with the Philadelphia Eagles, who had selected him in the 1959 NFL Draft, Carlton, a Duke University running back, traveled to Toronto and the Canadian Football League (CFL) to play for the Argonauts.  His Canadian career lasted only four games before he declined a trade to Vancouver, British Columbia, and went home. But another league and another opportunity was in his future.

In his early years with the Buffalo Bills of the American Football League (AFL), Carlton formed a virtually unstoppable backfield tandem, first with Elbert "Golden Wheels" Dubenion, then with Carlton Chester "Cookie" Gilchrist.

On September 18, 1960, in Buffalo's home opener, a 27–21 loss to the Denver Broncos, Carlton made history in the second quarter when he scored the team's first touchdown on a one-yard run. Carlton gained 1,010 yards from scrimmage (533 rushing and 477 receiving) and 11 touchdowns in the Bills first season.

Carlton briefly retired following the 1963 season, but re-signed with the Bills in July 1964.

Later he helped the Bills win back-to-back league championships in 1964 and 1965.  Perennially among the AFL's top rushers, he led the league in rushing touchdowns in 1965 and was voted to the American Football League Eastern Division All-Star team in 1965 and 1966.   Carlton was the Bills' all-time leading rusher during their AFL years, with a 4.1 yards per carry average. He was cut from the team in the 1968 preseason; he, along with Dubenion (who finished the 1968 season then retired), were the last players from the Bills' inaugural season still on the roster.

Carlton was inducted into The Greater Wilmington Sports Hall of Fame in 2008 and the North Carolina Sports Hall of Fame in 2012.

See also
 List of American Football League players

References

1937 births
Living people
American football running backs
American players of Canadian football
Canadian football running backs
Buffalo Bills players
Duke Blue Devils football players
Toronto Argonauts players
American Football League All-Star players
People from Wallace, North Carolina
Players of American football from North Carolina
American Football League players